Lieutenant-General Urano Teixeira da Matta Bacellar (1947 – January 6, 2006) was a Brazilian soldier.  He was born in Bagé in the state of Rio Grande do Sul.  He served for 39 years in the Brazilian Army and eventually rose to the rank of Lieutenant-General. He was married and had two children.

On September 1, 2005, he was selected to lead the military contingent of MINUSTAH, the UN peacekeeping force in Haiti, replacing his fellow Brazilian, Lieutenant-General Augusto Heleno Ribeiro Pereira.

Graduated at the Agulhas Negras Military Academy, he was a decorated officer. Having a great career, he was also a teacher at AMAN. He was nominated to lead the UN mission MINUSTAH in Haiti.

On January 7, 2006, General Bacellar was found dead, fallen from a chair on the balcony of his hotel room in Port-au-Prince. State news agency Agência Brasil said Lt. Gen. Urano Teixeira Da Matta Bacellar was the victim of "a firearms accident".  Later that day, UN and Brazilian officials said that he appeared to have shot himself in the head, several days after national elections had been postponed for a fourth time. Bacellar was also a teacher of geography and of Brazilian Studies in military schools. He was 58 years old.

An autopsy was also performed, to determine the exact cause of death and the calibre of the weapon that killed him. On January 12, 2006, both the UN and the Brazilian government announced suicide as the official cause of death.

In January 2011, Diplomatic cables from 2005 and 2006 released by WikiLeaks in the United States diplomatic cables leak, revealed that Dominican Republic President Leonel Fernández suspected Bacellar had been assassinated by a group of Contras led by Guy Philippe, a former soldier and police chief and a Haitian anti-Aristide "rebel" leader that had been armed by the USA.

The same cables also reveal that the contras, accordingly to President Fernandez, had the mandate of creating chaos in Haiti and had even killed a Canadian and a Jordanian MINUSTAH member in the past and that the killing could have been a response to Bacellar's reluctancy in using force in Haiti's shanty town Cité Soleil regardless pressure from Washington and a pressure campaign by Chamber of Commerce head Reginald Boulos and André Apaid, the latter a sweatshop king in Haiti and both main figures in the civic front named Group 184 that played a main role in ousting President Aristide in the 2004 coup.

His position as leader of the military contingent of MINUSTAH was temporarily filled by his deputy, Chilean General Eduardo Aldunate Herman. On January 17, 2006, it was announced that Brazilian General Augusto Heleno Ribeiro Pereira would be the permanent replacement for Bacellar as the head of the United Nations' Haiti military force.

His body was returned to Brasília to burial with full military honours in Rio de Janeiro.

References 

  ' New commander leads Haiti force', BBC News, September 1, 2005
  'Leader of U.N. Haiti peacekeeping force found dead', CNN, January 7, 2006
  'Haiti UN mission chief found dead', BBC News, January 8, 2006
  'UN commander in Haiti found dead', CBC News, January 8, 2006

1947 births
2006 deaths
Brazilian generals
United Nations military personnel
People from Bagé
Suicides by firearm in Haiti